Noel Marguerite Robertson (née MacDonald; January 23, 1915 – May 13, 2008) was a basketball player for the Edmonton Grads. In 1938, MacDonald was awarded the Bobbie Rosenfeld Award and Velma Springstead Trophy as the best Canadian female athlete of the year. She was inducted into the Canada's Sports Hall of Fame in 1971 and Canada Basketball Hall of Fame in 1978.

Early life and education
On January 23, 1915, Noel MacDonald was born in Mortlach, Saskatchewan. She went to school in Moose Jaw before moving with her family to Edmonton, Alberta for high school. After graduating from Victoria High School, MacDonald studied business at McDougall Commercial High School.

Career
MacDonald started her basketball career with the Edmonton Gradettes in 1931 before joining the Edmonton Grads in 1933. On the Grads, she played as a forward and centre before being promoted to captain in 1936. After her promotion to captain, MacDonald and her teammates won a demonstration basketball tournament at the 1936 Summer Olympics. MacDonald retired from the Grads in 1939 with a points per game average of 13.8 and an all-time Grads best of 1,874 points. After her retirement, MacDonald became a basketball coach in Estevan, Saskatchewan and a secretary in Libya.

Awards and achievements
In 1938, MacDonald won the Velma Springstead Trophy for best female athlete of Canada. When MacDonald won the Bobbie Rosenfeld Award the same year, she became the first and only woman to receive the award for women's basketball. In 1944, she was named by her former coach Percy Page as the best player in the history of the Edmonton Grads.

MacDonald has been inducted in the Canada's Sports Hall of Fame in 1971 and the Canada Basketball Hall of Fame in 1978.

Personal life
In 1939, with 17 games left in her final season MacDonald eloped with Harry Robertson, a former Canadian National hockey player turned oil businessman (in Idaho) keeping their marriage secret for the remainder of the season as married women were not allowed to play on the team. They had two children together. Son Donald, and daughter Dale Larsen, with three grandchildren. Jordan Robertson, Damion Larsen and Kalia Larsen Edmunds.

Death
On May 13, 2008, MacDonald died from Alzheimer's disease in Edmonton, Alberta.

References

1915 births
2008 deaths
Canadian women's basketball players
Neurological disease deaths in Alberta
Deaths from Alzheimer's disease
Basketball people from Saskatchewan